This is a list of famines.

List

See also

Main article lists 

 Bengal famine
 Droughts and famines in Russia and the Soviet Union
 Famine in India
 Famines in the Czech lands
 Famines in Ethiopia
 Great Bengal famine of 1770
 Great Famine of 1876–1878
 Great Chinese Famine
 Holodomor
 Khmer Rouge
 List of famines in China
 North Korean famine
 Timeline of major famines in India during British rule

Other articles 

 2007–2008 world food price crisis
 2010–2012 world food price crisis
 2022–2023 food crises
 Disaster
 Famine Early Warning Systems Network
 Famine events
 Famine relief
 Famine scales
 Food security
 Food security during the COVID-19 pandemic
 List of natural disasters by death toll
 List of wars and anthropogenic disasters by death toll
 Live Aid
 Medieval demography
 Population decline
 Potato famine
 Starvation
 Theories of famines
 World population

References

Bibliography

External links 

Famines
Famines
Famine